The 1962 Missouri Tigers football team was an American football team that represented the University of Missouri in the Big Eight Conference (Big 8) during the 1962 NCAA University Division football season. The team compiled an 8–1–2 record (5–1–1 against Big 8 opponents), finished in second place in the Big 8, and outscored opponents by a combined total of 204 to 62. Dan Devine was the head coach for the fifth of 13 seasons. The team played its home games at Memorial Stadium in Columbia, Missouri.

The Tigers defeated the Georgia Tech Yellow Jackets 14-10 in the Bluebonnet Bowl in Houston.

The team's statistical leaders included Johnny Roland with 830 rushing yards, 850 yards of total offense, and 78 points, Jim Johnson with 198 passing yards, Bill Tobin with 75 receiving yards, and Bill Tobin with 38 point scored.

Schedule

References

Missouri
Missouri Tigers football seasons
Bluebonnet Bowl champion seasons
Missouri Tigers football